Stictosia is a genus of moths in the family Erebidae and are common to the geographical region of Borneo.

Species
Stictosia flexilisana (Walker, 1863)
Stictosia flava (van Eecke, 1927)
Stictosia crocea Holloway, 2001
Stictosia decubitana (Walker, 1863)

References

Natural History Museum Lepidoptera generic names catalog

Nudariina
Moth genera